Olga Pavlovna Mineyeva (born September 1, 1952 in Degtyarsk, Sverdlovsk Oblast) is a Soviet athlete, who competed for the USSR at the 1980 Summer Olympics held in Moscow, Russia. There she won the silver medal in the 800 metres in 1:54.81 minutes, splitting teammates Nadezhda Olizarenko and Tatyana Providokhina for a Soviet clean sweep of the medals. She also won the gold medal in the 800 metres at the 1982 European Championships in Athletics, finishing with a time of 1:55.41 at the event in Athens.

References

1952 births
Living people
Olympic athletes of the Soviet Union
Athletes (track and field) at the 1972 Summer Olympics
Athletes (track and field) at the 1980 Summer Olympics
Russian female middle-distance runners
Soviet female middle-distance runners
Olympic silver medalists for the Soviet Union
European Athletics Championships medalists
Medalists at the 1980 Summer Olympics
Olympic silver medalists in athletics (track and field)
People from Sverdlovsk Oblast
Sportspeople from Sverdlovsk Oblast